São Paulo LGBTQ Pride Parade is an annual gay pride parade that has taken place in Avenida Paulista, in the city of São Paulo, Brazil, since 1997. It is South America’s largest Pride parade, and is listed by Guinness World Records as the biggest pride parade in the world starting in 2006 with 2.5 million people. They broke the Guinness record in 2009 with four million attendees. They have kept the title from 2006 to at least 2016. They had five million attendants in 2017. As of 2019 it has three to five million attendants each year. In 2019, it was also the second larger event of the city  of São Paulo in terms of total revenue (after Carnaval)  and the first in terms of daily revenue. In 2010, the city hall of São Paulo invested 1 million reais in the parade. According to the LGBT app Grindr, the gay parade of the city was elected the best in the world.

The Pride and its associated events are organized by the APOGLBT (Associação da Parada do Orgulho de Gays, Lesbicas, Bissexuais e Travestis e Transexuais), since its foundation in 1999. The march is the event's main activity and the one that draws the biggest attention to the press, the Brazilian authorities as well as to the hundreds of thousands of curious people that line themselves along the parade's route. In 2009, 3.2 million people attended the 13th annual São Paulo Gay Pride Parade. 

The meeting point is at the Museum of Art of São Paulo (MASP – Museu de Arte de São Paulo) right at the middle of São Paulo's postcard Avenida Paulista.  Even though the meeting time is at 12 noon, the parade doesn't start to move before 2 or 3 PM. The parade is 2.6 miles long (4.2 km) and starts at Avenida Paulista (MASP), at around noon. It follows Rua da Consolação to the end at Praça Roosevelt, in Downtown São Paulo, at around 10 PM.

The São Paulo Gay Pride Parade is heavily supported by the federal government as well as by the Governor of São Paulo and the city mayor. Many politicians show up to open the main event and the government often parades with a float with politicians on top of it. Caixa Econômica Federal, a government bank, and Petrobrás, Brazil's oil firm, have already reaffirmed their commitment to back up the event and its diversity, funding once again the event.
In the Pride the city usually receives about 400,000 tourists and moves between R$ 180 million and R$ 190 million. Because of this support, the event has many security measures in place. Since the election of Jair Bolsonaro as president of Brazil in 2018, there has been concern that the federal government would withdraw support for the parade, given Bolsonaro's previous anti-LGBTQ sentiments.

Due to the COVID-19 pandemic, the parade was celebrated virtually in June 2020. The in-person parade was initially postponed until November 29, 2020, but was ultimately cancelled entirely.

Participants

The first parade in 1997 gathered around 2,000 participants, according to the military police. The ninth parade gathered over 2.5 million people according to the police and 3 million according to the organizers. 

The military police, which traditionally counts the number of participants at major public events, does not release its estimates for attendance at the parade since then, which caused the omission of the Parade from the 2008 issue of Guinness that requires official sources for records regarding attendance at events. According to the police, it would be impossible to count the number of people attending an event with a "floating population." There has been controversy about the exact number of participants.

Slogans

 1997 – "We are many, we are in every occupation"
 1998 – "The rights of gays, lesbians and travestis are human rights"
 1999 – "Gay pride in Brazil, on the way of the year 2000"
 2000 – "Celebrating the pride of living diversity"
 2001 – "Embracing diversity"
 2002 – "Educating for diversity"
 2003 – "Building homosexual policies"
 2004 – "We have family and pride"
 2005 – "Civil partnership now. Equal rights! Neither more nor less"
 2006 – "Homophobia is a crime! Sexual rights are human rights"
 2007 – "For a world without racism, macho sexism and homophobia"
 2008 – "Homophobia kills! For a secular state de facto"
 2009 – "No homophobia, more citizenship – For the isonomy of rights!"
 2010 – "Vote against homophobia, defend citizenship" (*2010 is election year in Brazil)
 2011 – "Love one Another. Enough with homophobia"
 2012 – "Homophobia has a cure: Education and criminalization"
 2013 – "Back to the closet, never again! Union and awareness in the fight against homophobia"
 2014 – "A successful country is a country without homophobia. No more deaths! Criminalization now! " 
 2015 – "I was born like this, I grew up like this, I will always be like this: respect me!"
 2016 – "Gender identity law, now! - All people together against transphobia!"
 2017 – "Regardless of our beliefs, no religion is law! Together for a secular state!"
 2018 – "Power to LGBTI+. Our Vote, Our Voice."
 2019 – "50 Years of Stonewall - Our Achievements, Our Pride to be LGBT+."
 2022 – "Vote With Pride."

See also

 List of LGBT events
 LGBT rights in Brazil
 Gay pride
 Gay pride parade
 Beyond Carnival by James N. Green

References

External links
 Official website of the São Paulo Gay Pride Parade organization 
 About the São Paulo Gay Pride at BBC.co.uk 
Parada Gay and the record of participants 
LGBT Pride of São Paulo 

LGBT events in Brazil
Pride parades
Tourist attractions in São Paulo
Parades in Brazil
1997 establishments in Brazil
Recurring events established in 1997
Culture in São Paulo